Gattico-Veruno is a comune (municipality) in the province of Novara, Piedmont, northern Italy. It was created in late 2018 after the merger of Gattico and Veruno.

Cities and towns in Piedmont